Jewel Changi Airport (also known as Jewel or Jewel Changi) is a nature-themed entertainment and retail complex surrounded by and linked to one of the passenger terminals of Changi Airport, Singapore. Its centrepiece is the world's tallest indoor waterfall, the Rain Vortex, that is surrounded by a terraced forest setting.

Jewel includes gardens, attractions, a hotel, about 300 retail and dining outlets, as well as early baggage check-in aviation facilities. Its attractions include the Shiseido Forest Valley, an indoor garden spanning five storeys, and the Canopy Park at the topmost level, featuring gardens and leisure facilities.

Jewel receives about 300,000 visitors per day. In October 2019, six months after its soft opening, it had welcomed 50 million visitors, exceeding its initial target for the whole year.

Conception
Jewel was conceived to maintain Changi Airport's status as a major aviation hub in the Asia-Pacific. It was first mentioned by Prime Minister Lee Hsien Loong in his National Day Rally speech in 2013 as part of Changi Airport's long-term plans to double its capacity by the mid-2020s and "create more opportunities for Singapore and Singaporeans".

Built over the former open-air car park in front of Changi Airport Terminal 1, Jewel expanded Terminal 1's arrival hall and baggage reclaim areas by 70%, and its handling capacity is also expected to increase from 21 to 24 million passengers a year. Jewel was officially opened on 18 October 2019 by Lee Hsien Loong, six months after its soft opening. During this time, it had received 50 million visitors – about 300,000 visitors a day – exceeding its initial target of 40–50 million visitors for the first year.

Jewel was developed by Jewel Changi Airport Trustee Pte Ltd, a joint venture between Changi Airport Group (CAG) and CapitaLand, through its wholly owned shopping mall business, CapitaLand Mall Asia. The project cost S$1.7 billion, and did not involve any government funds or taxpayers' money, despite both entities being either wholly or partially owned by Temasek Holdings, the state-owned investment company.

Design and development
Jewel's toroidal glass-and-steel façade was designed by a consortium of architects, led by Moshe Safdie, who also designed Singapore's Marina Bay Sands. Renowned local firm RSP Architects Planners & Engineers were the executive architect and structural engineers. The landscape architect was Peter Walker and Partners, who co-designed the National 9/11 Memorial in New York City, and worked with Safdie on the landscaping of Marina Bay Sands. Benoy were the interior designers; BuroHappold Engineering were responsible for the façade and Lighting Planners Associates handled the lighting. The Rain Vortex was engineered by water design firm WET Design. It has a 360-degree light and sound show projected onto it.

Jewel was envisioned to combine a marketplace and an urban park. "The component of the traditional mall is combined with the experience of nature, culture, education and recreation, aiming to provide an uplifting experience. By drawing both visitors and local residents alike, we aim to create a place where the people of Singapore interact with the people of the world," said Safdie.

The glass panels of the dome are framed in steel which rests on a complex latticework. At night, the glowing dome is visible from all surrounding areas.

Attractions

Shiseido Forest Valley 
It houses around 3,000 trees and 60,000 shrubs of 120 species that live in high-altitude tropical forests from around the world.

The Rain Vortex

An acrylic funnel at the bottom prevents splashing and insulates the sound of the cascade. The toroid-shaped roof has more than 9,000 pieces of glass spanning  with a sloped oculus as the mouth of the waterfall acting as "a continuation of the building...completed in a liquid form." At night, the circular walls of the waterfall becomes a 360-degree stage for a light-and-sound show.

To prevent excess humidity in the Jewel, the waterfall's flow alternates between cascades and trickles that reduce air turbulence. The design process by WET Design engineers included testing a one-fifth-scale model and a full-size partial prototype.

The Changi Airport Skytrain connecting the terminals passes above ground near the waterfall, allowing passengers remaining airside to see the Vortex and Jewel itself.

Canopy Park
At the topmost level of Jewel, the  Canopy Park houses recreation and leisure attractions. About half of the total landscaping is hosted at Canopy Park, including two gardens: Topiary Walk and Petal Garden. The Topiary Walk features animal-shaped topiaries at every corner, while the Petal Garden has seasonal floral displays.

The park also consists of two mazes, situated at the eastern end of the Jewel called the Hedge Maze and Mirror Maze. The maze features gates that can be pushed within that will change the path of the maze. It ends at an elevated watchtower that offers a bird's-eye view of the entire maze. The Mirror Maze is located under the dome with plants branching across the top of the maze. The maze makes use of mirrors and various reflections.

Sky Nets - The Manulife-sponsored Sky Nets, provide children's play facilities, including a Bouncing Net and a Walking Net.
Discovery Slides - The Discovery Slides feature four integrated slides: two tube slides and two sliding surfaces. The Discovery Slides were designed by Carve and built by Playpoint in Singapore.

Changi Experience Studio 
The Changi Experience Studio is a  space with interactive games and displays relating to Changi Airport's history and allows visitors a behind-the-scenes look of how the airport is run.

Facilities

Hotel
A hotel within Jewel, with approximately 130 rooms, operated by the international hotel brand, YOTEL, opened on 12 April 2019. It is YOTEL's second hotel in Singapore after the 2017 opening of the YOTEL on Orchard Road.

Aviation facilities
An "integrated multi-modal transport lounge" provides ticketing, boarding pass collection and baggage transfer service in a single location. Early check-in facilities enable passengers to check-in and drop off luggage up to 24 hours ahead of regular check-in times. There are dedicated facilities for fly-cruise and fly-ferry passengers.

Retail

Jewel houses both local and international brands. Anchor tenants include the largest Nike store in Southeast Asia, the first and only Apple Store located inside an airport complex, Marks & Spencer, Muji, Zara, Uniqlo, Singapore's second basement cinema operated by Shaw Theatres with 11 screens including an IMAX theatre with a seating capacity of 828 and Five Spice, a food court by Food Junction with 19 unique stalls and supermarket chain FairPrice Finest. As of 2022, the Five Spice food court has been revamped into a Food Republic food court, as Food Junction was previously acquired by Food Republic.

Jewel also includes American burger chains A&W Restaurants and Shake Shack, Norwegian fast-casual restaurant Pink Fish, Swiss artisanal chocolatier Läderach, Sichuan restaurants Xiao Bin Lou and Yu's Kitchen, Boston-based ice cream parlour chain Emack & Bolio's, British casual eatery Burger & Lobster, Peruvian restaurant TONITO, Japan's Tokyo Milk Cheese Factory and the first permanent Pokémon Centre in East Asia outside of Japan. Most restaurants at the Basement 1 level, which included Pink Fish and Hoshino Coffee, closed down while the new tenant of half of the units in the Basement 1 level, Don Don Donki, started renovations. As of October 2022, Pink Fish has permanently closed down, while Hoshino Coffee has planned for a reopening after the revamp. McDonald's is also opening another outlet at that area, adding on to the Changi Airport T3 outlet.

Awards
Jewel Changi Airport was accorded the 2016 International Architecture Award by The Chicago Athenaeum, an international museum of architecture and design.

In November 2019, Jewel Changi Airport was awarded the Special Jury Award at the year's Mapic Awards.

In popular culture
The song "The Right Time" by Singaporean singer JJ Lin was inspired by Jewel, which was featured in its music video.

See also

 Infrastructure of Singapore Changi Airport

References

Commons category
 

Airport terminals
Changi Airport
Tourist attractions in Singapore
2019 establishments in Singapore
Neo-futurism architecture
CapitaLand
Buildings and structures completed in 2019